Blanford's mabuya (Eutropis innotata) ( is a species of skink found in peninsular India.

Description
Snout short, obtuse. Lower eyelid with an undivided transparent disk. Nostril pierced behind the vertical of the suture between the rostral and the first labial; no postnasal; anterior loreal in contact with the first labial; frontonasal broader than long, in contact with the rostral and (not constantly) with the frontal; latter a little shorter than the frontoparietals and interparietal together, in contact with the second supraocular only; 4 supraoculars, second very large; 6 supracilianes; frontoparietals distinct, slightly shorter than the interparietal, which entirely separates the parietals; a pair of nuchals ; 4 labials anterior to the subocular, which is at least twice as long as the neighbouring labials, and not narrower below. Bar-opening triangular, a little larger than a lateral scale, with three or four short lobules anteriorly. Nuchal and lateral scales mostly feebly tricarinate; dorsals quinquecarinate; 34 (or 32) scales round the middle of the body. The hind limb reaches the wrist of the adpressed fore limb.   Subdigital lamella smooth. 
Tail about 1.75 times length of head and body. Bronzy olive above, aides dark brown; a light, black-edged streak on each side, from the prefrontal and along the supraciliaries to the anterior third of the back, where it gradually disappears ; a light streak from below the eye to the shoulder; lower surfaces whitish.
From snout to vent 2.2 inches ; tail 3.75. Penganga Valley, S.E. Berar.

Distribution
Southern and central India.

Notes

References
 Blanford, W.T. 1870 Notes on some Reptilia and Amphibia from Central India. J. Asiat. Soc. Bengal  39: 335-376
 Smith, M.A. 1935 Reptiles and Amphibia, Vol. II. in: The fauna of British India, including Ceylon and Burma. Taylor and Francis, London, 440 pp.

External links
 

Eutropis
Reptiles of India
Endemic fauna of India
Reptiles described in 1870
Taxa named by William Thomas Blanford